James MacManaway  (1860 – 29 November 1947) was an Anglican bishop.

Born in County Roscommon in 1860, MacManaway was educated at Trinity College, Dublin  and ordained in 1888. He was Curate of Clanabogan then Rector of  Termonmaguirk; and after that the incumbent at Fivemiletown. He became a Canon of St Patrick's Cathedral, Dublin, in 1912 and Archdeacon of Clogher in 1917. He was appointed Bishop of Clogher in 1923 and served the diocese for 20 years. He died on 29 November 1947.

MacManaway married Sarah Thompson from Co. Kilkenny with whom he had sons Lancelot, Richard and James Godfrey and Daughter Mary.
His son, James Godfrey MacManaway, was also a Church of Ireland clergyman and became a politician.

Arms

Notes

1947 deaths
Alumni of Trinity College Dublin
Archdeacons of Clogher
20th-century Anglican bishops in Ireland
Bishops of Clogher (Church of Ireland)
1860 births